Dr. B. R. Ambedkar National Institute of Technology Jalandhar (NIT Jalandhar  or NITJ), formerly Regional Engineering College Jalandhar, is a public engineering university located in Jalandhar, Punjab, India. It has been declared as an Institute of National Importance under the Ministry of Human Resource Development, Govt of India.  It is a member of the National Institutes of Technology (NITs) system, a group of premier Indian technical institutes governed by the Council of NITSER. It was founded as a joint venture between the governments of Punjab and India, originally under the name Regional Engineering College, Jalandhar, Punjab, India (RECJ). RECJ (now NITJ) was established in 1989 by the joint venture of Govt of India and Govt of Punjab on the Land of Village Bidhipur and Village Suranussi of District Jalandhar (Punjab) on the Grand Trunk Road bye-pass.

History

Dr B R Ambedkar National Institute of Technology was established in the year 1987 as Regional Engineering College and was given the status of National Institute of Technology (Deemed University) by the Government of India on October 17, 2002, under the aegis of Ministry of Human Resource Development, New Delhi. The Ministry of Human Resource Development, Government of India has declared the Institute as "Institute of National Importance" under the act of Parliament-2007.

Campus
The Institute campus is widespread over an area of 154 acres. It includes teaching facilities and residence buildings for students and staff, plus severan amenities.

In 2019 ISRO launched their space incubation center at NIT Jalandhar.

Housing
The students of National Institute of Technology, Jalandhar are drawn from all parts of the country. There are seven (plus one extension to hostel number 7)  boys' hostels, two girls' hostels, and a mega girls' hostel. A mega hostel with three blocks was recently constructed. The facilities of the reading room, indoor games, etc. are available in each hostel. Internet facility is provided in every hostel. Other facilities like geysers, water purifiers, and Washing Machines are provided in all the hostels. The residential accommodation in hostels comprises cubicles and dormitories which have four-seater, two-seater, and one-seater facilities allotted on the basis of the year and course of study the student is pursuing. There are badminton courts, volleyball court, and special reading rooms which provide a good environment in the hostels.

Organisation and administration

Departments

The various academic departments in the institute offer course based degree programmes and also degree programmes that are inclined towards research. There are fifteen academic departments in the institute. All the departments have the doctoral programme.

Academics

Admissions

The admissions to the B. Tech programs run by the institute are very competitive, with an acceptance ratio of nearly 2-3%. Students were admitted on the basis of All India Engineering Entrance Examination (AIEEE) till 2012 but from 2013 the admission is based on Joint Entrance Examination Main (JEE Main)  conducted across India. Total seats for B.Tech. is 652 for 2011 admissions. For the session of 2019–2020, the seats for B.Tech. had increased by 33% and 874 students were admitted for B.tech courses. Similarly, the number of postgraduate seats were also doubled. As of 2019, there are 3854 students in Graduate and postgraduate programs of the institute. Admissions to the MTech programs are by the GATE exam conducted by the IIT and IISc. The postgraduate admission is on the basis of research and interviews by the appropriate screening committees.

Placements
The institute is regularly visited by Indian and foreign multinational corporations for offering jobs to final-year B.Tech. and M.Tech. students. The ratio of the number of students placed to total number is nearly 1:1, with a number of students receiving multiple job offers. Campus Interviews are arranged for the final year B.Tech/ M.Tech/ M.Sc. students. The average salary offers at NIT Jalandhar, it is up nearly 54% in 2020. A large number of reputed Industrial houses in the country visit the Institution and select the final year students as Engineers/ Management Trainees. Some of the Companies invite the students to their Corporate Offices for the interviews. Major companies like Microsoft, Amazon, Infosys, Reliance Petrochemicals Limited, Hero Motor corp.

Ranking

In 2022 NIRF Rankings, the institute was ranked 52 among the top 100 engineering colleges of India. It ranked 33 among all government engineering colleges according to a survey conducted by India Today in 2022.

Student life

Cultural festivals

TechNITi: A techno-management fest that is conducted during the odd semester in mid-September. The fest involves events from all the departments, including from robotics, workshops, guest lectures, and informals.

Notable alumni
 Anindya Ghose - Director, Stern School of Business
 Upasan Taku - Co-founder, MobiKwik
 Ali Hyder Rizvi - Director, Morgan Stanley
 Ajit Mohan Karimpana, CEO, Furlenco

References

External links
 

Engineering colleges in Punjab, India
National Institutes of Technology
Educational institutions established in 1987
Education in Jalandhar
All India Council for Technical Education
1987 establishments in Punjab, India